Post-Apocalypto is the fourth studio album by American rock band Tenacious D. Produced by bassist John Spiker, it was released in North America on November 2, 2018, by Columbia Records. In addition to core members Jack Black and Kyle Gass, the album also marks the return of John Konesky (electric guitar), Spiker (bass) and Dave Grohl (drums), who have all performed on previous Tenacious D albums. The album features songs and audio snippets from Tenacious D in Post-Apocalypto, the band's animatic YouTube series to support the album.

Background
In June 2012, when asked about a sequel to Tenacious D in The Pick of Destiny, Black stated that the band had "found a loophole with the internet and animated shorts. That’s the world we’re looking to dive into, and not just for money, mainly for art." The band would mention later on in that year that they may make an Internet series "exclusive to YouTube" The project was a fantasy for Black and Gass for a few years, until the Donald Trump Presidential Campaign inspired them to write a post-apocalyptic pilot episode in 2016. The remaining episodes would be completed between 2017 and 2018.

Release and promotion

The band filmed a teaser for their Facebook page of them in the studio in May 2016. In December 2017, whilst on Kerrang Radio promoting Jumanji: Welcome to the Jungle, Black stated that the title of a new animated series would be called Tenacious D in Post-Apocalypto.

In May 2018, the band entered and left the stage of Hell & Heaven Metal Fest in Mexico City to recordings of "Post-Apocalypto Theme" and  "Post-Apocalypto Theme (Reprise)" - this being the world reveal of these tracks. A few days later, the band uploaded a tour trailer to their website and social media, also teasing a new album.

Track listing

Personnel
Official members
Jack Black – vocals, acoustic guitar
Kyle Gass – acoustic guitar, backing vocals, recorder

Additional members
John Konesky – electric guitar
John Spiker – bass guitar, keyboards
Scott Seiver – percussion, piano 
Dave Grohl – drums

Orchestra
Drew Taubenfeld – steel guitar
Paul Cartwright – strings
Mona Tian – strings
Molly Rogers – strings
Derek Stein – strings

Technical
John Spiker – producer, mixing engineer 
Matt Wolach – assistant engineer 
Bo Bodnar – assistant engineer 
Will Borza – assistant engineer
Howie Weinberg – mastering

Charts

References

External links

Tenacious D albums
2018 albums
Columbia Records albums
Albums produced by John Spiker